This article displays a list of All Blacks tours and series. The list includes all tours and series involving a rugby union team that represented the whole of New Zealand and was officially sanctioned by the body now known as New Zealand Rugby (NZR). Unofficial teams, such as the 1986 New Zealand Cavaliers, and teams from before the formation of NZR (in 1892) are not included.

Tours and series

References

Bibliography
All Blacks Tour 1963–64, Mulligan Andrew, Souvenir Press (1964), ASIN B0019OAAN8
Henry's All Blacks: The 2007 World Cup Campaign, Murray Deaker, HarperCollins Publishers (New Zealand) (25 April 2008), 
Goodbye to Glory: All Blacks Tour of South Africa, 1976, Terry McLean, Pelham Books (June 1977),

External links

 
Lists of national rugby union team results
matches